Pygela or Phygela (Φύγελα) was a small town of ancient Ionia, on the coast of the Caystrian Bay, a little to the south of Ephesus. According to Greek mythology, it was said to have been founded by Agamemnon, and to have been peopled with the remnants of his army; it contained a temple of Artemis Munychia. Dioscorides commends the wine of this town. It was a polis (city-state) and a member of the Delian League. Silver and bronze coins dated to the 4th century BCE bearing the legends «ΦΥΓΑΛΕΩΝ» or «ΦΥΓ» are attributed to the town.

It is said to have taken its name because some of the men of Agamemnon remained there after they had had a disease of the buttocks (πυγαί).

Harpocration wrote that according to Theopompos it took its name when some of the men with Agamemnon stayed there on account of a disease to do with their buttocks (pygai, πυγαί). Suda wrote the same about the name of the place.

Strabo wrote that Demetrius was speaking of the existence of Amazons near Pygela.

It is located near Kuşadası, Asiatic Turkey.

In the "Indictment of Madduwatta", it is mentioned, under the Hittite name Piggaya, as being allied to the Ahhiyawa king Attarissiya. The "Indictment" is dated to the early-fourteenth century b.c. in the Reign of Arnuwanda I, and Attarissiya is popularly identified with Atreus, which would mean that the city predates a founding by Agamemnon and the traditional date of the Trojan war.

References

Populated places in ancient Ionia
Former populated places in Turkey
Greek city-states
Members of the Delian League
Locations in Greek mythology
Kuşadası District
History of Aydın Province
Ancient Greek archaeological sites in Turkey